Everyone Dies Alone / Alone in Berlin (Original title: Jeder stirbt für sich allein) is a 1976 West German drama film adapted from the Hans Fallada novel Every Man Dies Alone. The book was based on the story of two ordinary Germans, Otto and Elise Hampel, who committed acts of civil disobedience against the Third Reich, were caught and sentenced to death.

Synopsis 
The film takes place in Berlin in 1940, during World War II as Adolf Hitler is at the height of his power. Anna and Otto Quangel, a working class couple, live in Berlin in simple circumstances and are not particularly interested in politics. Then, their only son is killed in action during the Battle of France and as they grieve for their son, the desire to resist the Nazi regime grows within them. When a Jewish neighbor is also killed, Anna decides to join the German Resistance. She begins writing very personal flyers on postcards, which she at first alone and then with her husband, leaves in public places and slips into mailboxes. The two are discovered, arrested and eventually sentenced to death. Otto Quangel commits suicide in the courtroom with a cyanide pill; his wife is executed two months later.

Reception 
The Lexikon des deutschen Films published in 1995 by German publisher Reclam called the film Vohrer's most challenging work, stating further, "albeit somewhat sentimental, but without sensationalist moments, this film adaptation comes near Fallada's original. Especially haunting is the focused and unadorned performance by Hildegard Knef."

Other screen versions 
There are two earlier screen adaptations of Fallada's book and one later. The first filmed version was Falk Harnack's 1962 television play, Jeder stirbt für sich allein produced and broadcast in West Germany. Anna and Otto Quangel were played by Edith Schultze-Westrum and Alfred Schieske. In 1970, DEFA produced a three-part miniseries, Jeder stirbt für sich allein in East Germany, directed by Hans-Joachim Kasprzik. Elsa Grube-Deister and Erwin Geschonneck played the main roles and supported by Wolfgang Kieling and Fred Delmare among others. In 2004, a Czech version, I ve smrti sami, was produced as a television miniseries, directed by Dušan Kleina and broadcast in the Czech Republic.

As Alone in Berlin the novel was again adapted for the big screen in 2016. It was directed by Vincent Perez  with Emma Thompson and Brendan Gleeson as Otto and Elise Hampel.

Cast 
 Hildegard Knef as Anna Quangel
 Carl Raddatz as Otto Quangel
 Martin Hirthe as Escherich
 Gerd Böckmann as Schröder
 Sylvia Manas as Trudel Baumann
 Peter Matić as Enno Kluge
 Heinz Reincke as Emil Borkhausen
 Beate Hasenau as Karla Borkhausen
 Hans Korte as Obergruppenführer Prall
 Alexander Radszun as Otti Quangel
 Rudolf Fernau
 Brigitte Mira
 Heinz Ehrenfreund
 Edith Heerdegen
 Wilhelm Borchert
 Pinkas Braun
 Friedrich G. Beckhaus
 Kurt Buecheler
 Dietrich Frauboes
 Jacques Breuer
 Wolf Goldan
 Renate Grosser	
 Heinz Spitzner
 Klaus Miedel
 Arnold Marquis
 Otto Czarski

See also 
 List of Germans who resisted Nazism

References

Sources 
 Hans Fallada: Jeder stirbt für sich allein. Roman. Aufbau-Verlag Berlin, ungekürzte Neuauflage 2011, 704 S.,

External links 
 
 Jeder stirbt für sich allein Filmportal.de
 Jeder stirbt für sich allein... (mit Hildegard Knef, Hans Korte) YouTube

1976 films
1976 drama films
German drama films
West German films
1970s German-language films
Films set in Berlin
Films based on German novels
Films about the German Resistance
Films about capital punishment
Films directed by Alfred Vohrer
Films scored by Gerhard Heinz
Constantin Film films
1970s German films
Adaptations of works by Hans Fallada